(7341) 1991 VK is a near-Earth minor planet in the Apollo group. It was discovered by Eleanor F. Helin and Kenneth J. Lawrence at the Palomar Observatory in California on 1 November 1991. It is listed as a potentially hazardous object. Every 5 years (from 1946 through 2091) the asteroid makes a close approach to the Earth.

See also 
 List of asteroid close approaches to Earth
 List of Earth-crossing minor planets
 List of minor planets: 7001–8000

References

External links 
 
 
 

007341
Discoveries by Eleanor F. Helin
Discoveries by Kenneth J. Lawrence
007341
007341
19911101